Jon André Fredriksen (born 5 April 1982) is a retired Norwegian professional footballer who played as a midfielder.

Career
Fredriksen started his career in his native Norway with Råde, before joining Moss and then Sarpsborg 08.

During a scouting trip to Norway, Fredriksen was spotted by Hartlepool United manager Chris Turner, signing him in July 2009. He made his debut for Hartlepool in a League One match on 8 August, away to Milton Keynes Dons in the 0–0 draw, before being substituted for Jonny Rowell in the 89th minute. He went on to make 12 league appearances in his first league season with the club. He left the club after having his contract cancelled by mutual consent on 20 October 2010.

On 18 October 2014 he retired from football after 11 seasons (2002–08 and 2011–14) with Moss. However, he returned to Råde in the Fifth Division.

References

External links
Jon André Fredriksen profile at Vital Hartlepool

1982 births
Living people
People from Østfold
People from Moss, Norway
Norwegian footballers
English Football League players
Moss FK players
Sarpsborg 08 FF players
Hartlepool United F.C. players
Norwegian expatriate footballers
Expatriate footballers in England
Norwegian expatriate sportspeople in England
Association football midfielders
Sportspeople from Viken (county)